Launch Complex 48 (LC-48) is a multi-user launch site for small launchers and spacecraft. It is located south of Launch Complex 39A and north of Space Launch Complex 41.

The construction of LC-48 began in November 2019 but was halted in March 2020 due to the ongoing COVID-19 pandemic. Construction was resumed in June 2020, with the completion of the first pad in October 2020.

LC-48 is designed as a "clean pad" to support multiple launch systems with differing propellant needs. While initially only planned to have a single pad, the complex is capable of being expanded to two at a later date. With another pad constructed, LC-48 could support up to 104 launches per year, though actual usage is expected to be well below that.

NASA had previously constructed LC-39C within the bounds of LC-39B with the purpose of serving small launchers, but the operational constraints of sharing the site on a non-interference basis with both the Space Launch System and OmegA (now canceled) launch vehicles, along with greater interest by commercial parties than originally anticipated, led NASA to pursue the construction of a dedicated launch site for this class of vehicles.

See also
 Rocket Lab Launch Complex 1
 List of Cape Canaveral and Merritt Island launch sites
 Pacific Spaceport Complex – Alaska

References

Citations

Sources

External links

 Exploration Ground Systems website at NASA.gov
 Kennedy Space Center Master Plan at KSC.NASA.gov
 Spaceport Development – Space Florida at SpaceFlorida.gov
 LC-48 Completed at floridaytoday.com

Kennedy Space Center launch sites